Stonewall's Rainbow Laces Campaign is an annual event in support of the LGBTQ+ community and the support of increasing diversity in sports across the world.

The campaign was started in 2013 and has been promoted by the biggest sports in the world from men's and women's association football to wheelchair rugby. Stonewall have support from a group called TeamPride. TeamPride consists of Adidas, Aon, Aviva, Barclays, eBay, Manchester United, the Premier League, Sky Sports and Visa.

Stonewall promise to give individuals the confidence and support them to strive towards their dreams. They want to make members of the LGBTQ+ community feel comfortable playing their favourite sport with pride as they believe people perform better when they are themselves.

Rainbow Laces 
Players are able to support for the LGBTQ+ community by wearing rainbow laces provided and sold by Stonewall and captains are able to demonstrate their encouragement by wearing a multicoloured armband, replacing their original armband.

In 2020, Stonewall announced that they had sold nearly one million sets of laces across the campaign so far, with players of all sports wearing their laces from the top leagues to those who for fun. The message has been heavily demonstrated in football, with grassroots football being a huge advocate for the campaign.

History 
Founded in 2013, Stonewall wanted to make a big change within the sports industry. The campaign was introduced to fight homophobia in all sports across the world, changing the dynamic of sports such as football.

The campaign started by sending out rainbow laces to every professional footballer in the UK for players to show their support. Paddy Power were big advocate's for the cause from the start, teaming up with Stonewall in September, 2013. 

Stonewall run their campaign every year in November and December and has been run every year since its formation in 2013.

Praise 
Stonewall's Rainbow Laces Campaign has been praised heavily since its creation in 2013. in 2019, The Independent asked for more to be done in sport to support LGBTQ+ rights and commended the work that had been done by Stonewall so far.

In 2021, Liverpool manager Jurgen Klopp displayed his support for the cause as Liverpool F.C. became a pioneer for Stonewall, and Klopp announced that there is an open dressing room within his team. He also ensured there will never be any issues with LGBTQ+ rights in the Liverpool dressing room.

Criticism 
The campaign was criticised in 2013 when Football v Homophobia claimed that Stonewall's language used during the campaign was the very language that they should be tackling and fighting against. Football v Homophobia felt that Stonewall was using slogans that reinforced the homophobia in football, and clubs such as Manchester United, who are big supporters of the cause, pulled out of the campaign whilst the disagreement was ongoing.

Football v Homophobia's statement has since been deleted, and the support for Stonewall's Rainbow Lace Campaign has continued to grow.

References 

LGBT sports